Kaikaluru is a town in Eluru district of the Indian state of Andhra Pradesh. Kaikalur is home to Kolleru Lake, one of the largest freshwater lakes in India, covering about 90,100 hectares and is a tourist attraction.

Geography
Sri Syamalamba temple is one of the famous temples there.

Demographics

The average literacy rate was 78.46%, comprising  people, significantly higher than the national average of 73.00%.

Transportation

Nearest railway stations 
Kaikaluru railway station is the main railway station, located on the Vijayawada-Nidadavolu branch railway line.

Kaikaluru railway station is categorized as a Non-Suburban Grade-5 (NSG-5) station in the Vijayawada railway division.

National Highways 
NH165 from Pamarru to Palakollu passes through Kaikaluru, and is a Spur road of NH65 at Pamarru ending at Palakollu.

Public bus services 
APSRTC operates bus services from Kaikaluru to Eluru, Machilipatnam, Vijayawada, Bhimavaram, Narasapuram, Palakollu, Razolu, Kakinada, Srikakulam, Palasa, Visakhapatnam, Gudivada, Mudinepalli and Hyderabad.

Tourist destinations 

Kolleru Lake is the largest freshwater lake in India, situated between the Krishna and Godavari delta. The lake is fed directly by water from the seasonal Budameru and Tammileru streams. The lake is an important habitat for an estimated 20 million resident and migratory birds such as the grey or spot-billed pelican. It was designated as a wetland of international importance in November 2002 under the international Ramsar Convention.

Temples 
 Sri Syamalamba Temple
 Sri Vasavi Kanyakaparameswari Temple
 Sri Pothuluri Veera Brahmendra Swamy Temple
 Sai Baba Temple
 Venkateswara Swamy Temple (Meesala Venkanna)

See also 
Villages in Kaikalur mandal
Kolleru Lake
Kolleru Bird Sanctuary

References 

Villages in Krishna district
Mandal headquarters in Krishna district